Vlasta Přikrylová (née Seifertová; born 1 July 1943) is a Czech track and field athlete. She competed in the women's long jump at the 1960 Summer Olympics.

References

1943 births
Living people
Athletes (track and field) at the 1960 Summer Olympics
Czech female long jumpers
Olympic athletes of Czechoslovakia
Athletes from Prague
Universiade medalists in athletics (track and field)
Universiade silver medalists for Czechoslovakia